Daniel Gerald Somerville (26 October 1879 – 1 July 1938)
was a Conservative Party politician in the United Kingdom.

He was elected at the 1922 general election as Member of Parliament (MP) for Barrow-in-Furness. He was re-elected in 1923, but was narrowly defeated at the 1924 election in a straight contest with the Labour Party candidate John Bromley.

He returned to the House of Commons at the 1929 general election as MP for the north-west London constituency of Willesden East. He held that seat until his death in 1938, aged 58. Somerville died on the same day as his predecessor as MP for Willesden East, George Frederick Stanley.

References

External links 
 

1879 births
1938 deaths
Conservative Party (UK) MPs for English constituencies
UK MPs 1922–1923
UK MPs 1923–1924
UK MPs 1929–1931
UK MPs 1931–1935
UK MPs 1935–1945